3310 is a Nokia cellphone released in 2000

3310 or variant, may also refer to:

In general
 A.D. 3310, a year in the 4th millennium CE
 3310 BC, a year in the 4th millennium BCE
 3310, a number in the 3000 (number) range

Products
 Nokia 3310 (2017), a cellphone released in 2017
 IBM 3310, a harddisk drive for minicomputers

Other uses
 3310 Patsy, an asteroid in the Asteroid Belt, the 3310th asteroid registered
 Texas Farm to Market Road 3310, a state highway

See also